Radnovce is a village and municipality in the Rimavská Sobota District of the Banská Bystrica Region of southern Slovakia. According to 2021 census, only 2.5% of inhabitants belong to the Slovak ethnic group, outnumbered by Hungarians (60.7%) and Romani (33.8%).

References

External links
http://www.statistics.sk/mosmis/eng/run.html

Villages and municipalities in Rimavská Sobota District
Romani communities in Slovakia